Ignace Brice (2 April 1795–10 August 1866) was a neoclassic painter of genre, portraits and religious scenes from Brussels.

Career 
Ignace Brice at first studied under his father, Antoine Brice, and at the Académie Royale des Beaux-Arts, where he was strongly influenced by Jacques-Louis David, then in exile in Brussels – Ignace became known as "le David bruxellois".  He followed his father as a professor at the Academy, and exhibited in Brussels in 1815, 1824, 1827, 1830 and 1833.  He also exhibited in Ghent, Antwerp and Amsterdam, and was one of the founders of the Société des Beaux-Arts de Bruxelles.

He was a genre painter and portraitist, and had a great talent for drawing.  His style was sober and classical and, besides David's influence, he reminds the viewer of the Port-Royal painters of the 17th century such as Philippe de Champaigne.

Family, marriage and issue
His father Antoine and his paternal grandfather Pierre-François were both painters.  Pierre-François was born in the French village of Saint-Venant, but left to settle in Brussels and become a painter at the court of Prince Charles-Alexandre of Lorraine.

In Brussels on 25 August 1825, Ignace married Hortense van Dievoet (1804–1854), great-grandniece of the Brussels sculptor Peter van Dievoet and of Philippe van Dievoet, known as Vandive, goldsmith to Louis XIV of France.

Gallery

Works 

 Lithographic portrait of Thérèse Langhendries, superior of the hôpital Saint-Jean de Bruxelles
 The young lady with her daughter in a garden, national Salon of 1842
 Portrait of Louis-Xavier Gomand (1803–1875)
 Portrait of Henri Joseph Meeûs, master-brewer, husband of Marie Madeleine van der Borcht.
 The Magician, oil on canvas, 120 x 108 cm.
 Portrait of Adrien Joseph Eugène Oorlof.
 Portrait of Hortense Poelaert (1815–1900), wife of Eugène van Dievoet (1804–1858), 1840, oil on canvas, 71 x 85 cm.
 Portrait of Jean-Louis van Dievoet (1777–1854), secretary to the Parquet de la Cour de Cassation (1777–1854), 61 x 70 cm, influenced by Jacques-Louis David.]
 The Poultryman (1827), painting by Ignace Brice, exhibited at the Brussels salon in 1827, now at the Rijksmuseum in Amsterdam
 The Holy Family surrounded by angels, oils, 1818. (now at the Centre Public d'aide sociale, Brussels).

Bibliography
  Paul De Zuttere, "Les Brice, peintres à Bruxelles aux XVIIIe et XIXe siècles", in L'Intermédiaire des Généalogistes, Bruxelles, n° 190, 1977, pp. 258–265.
  Paul De Zuttere, "Contribution à l'œuvre des peintres Antoine et Ignace Brice", in L'Intermédiaire des Généalogistes, Bruxelles, n° 345, 2003, p. 113–121.
  Messager des sciences historiques, Société royale des beaux-arts et de littérature de Gand, Société royale d'agriculture et de botanique de Gand. Published by P.F. de Goesin-Verhaeghe, 1879: page 469, "Ignace Brice (fils de maître)".

See also 

 List of Belgian painters
 Art of Belgium

1795 births
1866 deaths
Artists from Brussels
19th-century Belgian painters
19th-century Belgian male artists
Burials at Laeken Cemetery
Académie Royale des Beaux-Arts alumni